Serkan Aydın (born May 20, 2000) is a Turkish professional basketball player, who lastly played for Galatasaray of the Turkish Basketbol Süper Ligi (BSL) and the EuroCup.

Career
Serkan Aydın started his career with Galatasaray academy in 2011, after successful tryouts. 

On January 22, 2017, he made his BSL debut by playing 2 minutes against Büyükçekmece.

References

External links
TBLstat.net Profile
Euroleague Profile

2000 births
Living people
Galatasaray S.K. (men's basketball) players
Point guards
Basketball players from Istanbul